Mario Vrdoljak (born 21 July 1993) is a Croatian professional footballer who plays as a midfielder for Macedonian First Football League side Akademija Pandev.

Club career
Born in Livno, Vrdoljak started his career in clubs of Bosnia and Herzegovina and Croatia.

Serie C
For the 2017–18 season, he moved to Italy to Serie C club Bisceglie.

On 9 August 2018, he signed with Serie C club Francavilla.

After one season in Francavilla, on 19 July 2019 he moved to Picerno.

On 16 September 2020, he joined Serie C club Grosseto.

On 13 February 2022, he moved to Romania, and signed with Liga I club Academica Clinceni.

References

External links
 
 

1993 births
Living people
Sportspeople from Livno
Croats of Bosnia and Herzegovina
Association football midfielders
Croatian footballers
NK Junak Sinj players
NK Troglav 1918 Livno players
NK Zadar players
NK Imotski players
HNK Primorac Biograd na Moru players
FK Olimpik players
A.S. Bisceglie Calcio 1913 players
Virtus Francavilla Calcio players
AZ Picerno players
U.S. Grosseto 1912 players
LPS HD Clinceni players
Akademija Pandev players
First Football League (Croatia) players
Oberliga (football) players
Premier League of Bosnia and Herzegovina players
First League of the Federation of Bosnia and Herzegovina players
Serie C players
Liga I players
Croatian expatriate footballers
Expatriate footballers in Bosnia and Herzegovina
Croatian expatriate sportspeople in Bosnia and Herzegovina
Expatriate footballers in Germany
Croatian expatriate sportspeople in Germany
Expatriate footballers in Italy
Croatian expatriate sportspeople in Italy
Expatriate footballers in Romania
Croatian expatriate sportspeople in Romania